Charles Brian Handy CBE (born 25 July 1932) is an Irish author/philosopher specialising in organisational behaviour and management.  Among the ideas he has advanced are the "portfolio career" and the "Shamrock Organization" (in which professional core workers, freelance workers and part-time/temporary routine workers each form one leaf of the "Shamrock").

He has been rated among the Thinkers 50, a private list of the most influential living management thinkers.  In 2001 he was second on this list, behind Peter Drucker, and in 2005 he was tenth. When the Harvard Business Review had a special issue to mark their 50th Anniversary they asked Handy, Peter Drucker and Henry Mintzberg to write special articles.

In July 2006 he was conferred with an honorary Doctor of Laws by Trinity College, Dublin.

Life
Born the son of a Church of Ireland archdeacon in Clane, Co. Kildare, Ireland, Handy was educated as a boarder at Bromsgrove School and Oriel College, Oxford.

Handy's business career started in marketing at Shell International. He left Shell to teach at the London Business School in 1972 and spent a year in Boston observing the Massachusetts Institute of Technology's way of teaching business.

Career
 Marketing Executive, Shell International Petroleum Company 1956–65
 Economist, Charter Consolidated 1965–66
 International Faculty Fellow, MIT 1966–67
 London Business School 1967–95 (professor 1978–94)
 Warden, St George's House, Windsor Castle 1977–81
 Writer and broadcaster, 1981–

He was Chairman of the Royal Society of Arts from 1987 to 1989  and was instrumental in persuading Mark Goyder to join which led to the Tomorrow's Company inquiry.

He has honorary doctorates from Bristol Polytechnic (now the University of the West of England), UEA, Essex, Durham, Queen's University Belfast and the University of Dublin.  He is an Honorary Fellow of St Mary's College, Twickenham, the Institute of Education City and Guilds and Oriel College, Oxford. He was appointed a Commander of the Order of the British Empire (CBE) in the 2000 New Year Honours "for services to Personnel Management Education and Practice."

Ideas and style
A feel for Handy's style can be gained from the opening of his autobiography: "Some years ago I was helping my wife arrange an exhibit of her photographs of Indian tea gardens when I was approached by a man who had been looking at the pictures. 'I hear that Charles Handy is here,' he said. 'Indeed he is,' I replied, 'and I am he.'  He looked at me rather dubiously for a moment, and then said, 'Are you sure?'  It was, I told him, a good question because over time there had been many versions of Charles Handy, not all of which I was particularly proud."

Personal life
He was married to Elizabeth Handy, a photographer, with whom he collaborated on a number of books including The New Alchemists and A Journey through Tea.  Elizabeth (aged 77) died in a car accident in England on 5 March 2018. Their son Scott Handy is an actor who has performed with the RSC and their daughter Kate is an osteopath.

Books
Handy is the author of the following books:

Understanding Organisations (1976) – 
Gods of Management (1978) – 
The Future of Work (1984)
Understanding Schools (1986)
Understanding Voluntary Organisations (1988) 
The Age of Unreason (1989) – 
Inside Organisations (1990)
The Empty Raincoat (1994) – , US printing under title The Age of Paradox (1994) – 
Waiting for the Mountain to Move (1995)
Beyond Certainty (1995) - 
The Hungry Spirit (1997) – 
New Alchemists (1999) – 
Thoughts for the Day (1999) –  – (first published in 1991 as Waiting for the Mountain to Move)
The Elephant and the Flea (2001) – 
A Journey through Tea – with Elizabeth Handy
Re-invented lives (2002)
Myself and Other More Important Matters (2006) –  an autobiography and further reflections on life – 
The New Philanthropists (2006)
21 Ideas for Managers (2000) 
The Second Curve (2015)

References

External links

BBC Biography of Charles Handy
Biography at the Thinkers 50 2005 
The Handy Guide to the Gurus of Management
An Interview with Charles Handy (Part One), by C Honore, Ivey Business Journal, 2000  
An Interview with Charles Handy (Part Two), by C Honore, Ivey Business Journal, 2000  
An interview with Charles Handy, by Stephen Bernhut, Ivey Business Journal, 2004  
"The Shift to Non-Standard Employment" on British Columbia's Workinfonet

Further reading
Frances Hesselbein, Paul M. Cohen (eds.), Leader To Leader (Jossey Bass, 1999) 
Charles Handy. The Elephant and the Flea 

Irish business theorists
20th-century Irish economists
Alumni of Oriel College, Oxford
Academics of London Business School
Commanders of the Order of the British Empire
1932 births
Living people
People educated at Bromsgrove School
People from County Kildare
21st-century Irish economists